Wuzhile (reconstructed Old Turkic *Üç Elig or *Oçırlıq, ultimately from Pali Vajira) was the first Turgesh Qaghan, from the Sary (Yellow) Türgesh faction.

Early life 
He was titled Bagha Tarkhan (莫贺达干) during reign of Ashina Huseluo and unlike him was kind to his subjects. He took advantage of Ashina Tuizi rebellion to assert independence. He captured regional capital Suyab in 699 and became a major force in the area. Afterwards, Huseluo did not dare to turn back from Changan. Wuzhile had 20 generals with each commanding 7000 soldiers.

Reign 
After his expulsion of Western Turkic forces, he consolidated his rule around Suyab, while designating valley of Ili River as his second residence. He sent his son Zhenu (遮努) as an envoy on 12 August 699 to court of Wu Zetian, Changan. He was created Prince of Huaide (郡王懷德) in 706.

Death 
Later that year, Guo Yuanzhen - the new Protectorate General to Pacify the West - arrived at Turgesh tribe to meet with Wuzhile to discuss military matters. They met outside Wuzhile's tent, and It was cold and snowing at the time, but Guo did not move. Wuzhile, however, was old and could not stand the cold. He was created Prince of Xihe (郡王西河), however, he died in 706 before the envoy arrived. Wuzhile's son Suoge (娑葛), believing that Guo's acts were deliberate, gathered his troops and got ready to attack Guo. Guo's deputy Jie Wan (解琬) became aware of this and suggested that they flee. Guo declined—stating that he felt that he needed to show sincerity, and that given that they were deep in Tuqishi territory, they could not get away anyway. The next day, he went to mourn Wuzhile, and showed sincere emotions in doing so. Suoge was touched and made peace with him.

Religion 
According to Yuri Zuev, he was a manichaeist.

References 

7th-century rulers in Asia
7th-century Turkic people
8th-century rulers in Asia
8th-century Turkic people
706 deaths
Türgesh khagans
Founding monarchs